Voaden is an English language surname.

People with the surname 

 Arthur Voaden (?-1931), Canadian doctor
 Caroline Voaden (born 1968), British politician
 Herman Voaden (1903–1991), Canadian playwright and politician

References 


Surnames
English-language surnames